The 2004 Big West Conference men's basketball tournament was held March 10–13 at Anaheim Convention Center in Anaheim, California.

Pacific defeated  in the championship game, 75–73, to obtain the third Big West Conference men's basketball tournament championship in school history.

The Tigers earned the conference's automatic bid to the 2004 NCAA tournament as the #12 seed in the St. Louis region.

Format

Eight of the ten teams in the conference participated, with UC Irvine and  not qualifying. Teams were seeded based on regular season conference records. The top four seeds received byes, with the top two seeds receiving a second bye into the semifinal round.

Bracket

References

Big West Conference men's basketball tournament
Tournament
Big West Conference men's basketball tournament
Big West Conference men's basketball tournament